Huertea is a genus of plant in family Tapisciaceae, native to central and south America. Species include:
 Huertea cubensis
 Huertea glandulosa	
 Huertea granadina	
 Huertea putumayensis

References

Tapisciaceae
Rosid genera
Taxonomy articles created by Polbot